Margreet Catherina Maria Vissers is a New Zealand biochemistry academic,  and as of 2019 is a full professor at the University of Otago.

Academic career

After a PhD titled  'The Effects of neutrophil oxidants and proteinases on the degradation of glomerular basement membrane : implications for inflammatory tissue damage '  at the University of Otago, Vissers joined the staff, rising to full professor.

Vissers' research includes looking at Vitamin C's impact on immune cells and cancer.

Selected works 
 Kuiper, Caroline, Ilona GM Molenaar, Gabi U. Dachs, Margaret J. Currie, Peter H. Sykes, and Margreet CM Vissers. "Low ascorbate levels are associated with increased hypoxia-inducible factor-1 activity and an aggressive tumor phenotype in endometrial cancer." Cancer research 70, no. 14 (2010): 5749–5758.
 Carr, Anitra C., Stephanie M. Bozonet, Juliet M. Pullar, Jeremy W. Simcock, and Margreet CM Vissers. "Human skeletal muscle ascorbate is highly responsive to changes in vitamin C intake and plasma concentrations." The American journal of clinical nutrition 97, no. 4 (2013): 800–807.
 Brunetti-Pierri, Nicola, Gary E. Stapleton, Mark Law, John Breinholt, Donna J. Palmer, Yu Zuo, Nathan C. Grove et al. "Efficient, long-term hepatic gene transfer using clinically relevant HDAd doses by balloon occlusion catheter delivery in nonhuman primates." Molecular Therapy 17, no. 2 (2009): 327–333.
 Kuiper, Caroline, Gabi U. Dachs, Margaret J. Currie, and Margreet CM Vissers. "Intracellular ascorbate enhances hypoxia-inducible factor (HIF)-hydroxylase activity and preferentially suppresses the HIF-1 transcriptional response." Free Radical Biology and Medicine 69 (2014): 308–317.
 Carr, Anitra C., Margreet Vissers, and John S. Cook. "The effect of intravenous vitamin C on cancer-and chemotherapy-related fatigue and quality of life." Frontiers in oncology 4 (2014): 283.

References

External links
 
 

Living people
New Zealand women academics
Year of birth missing (living people)
University of Otago alumni
Academic staff of the University of Otago
New Zealand biochemists